Alai Hussain Ghasem (born 16 February 2003) is a footballer who plays for IFK Göteborg as a defender. Born in Sweden, he is an international for Iraq.

International career
Ghasem was born in Sweden to an Iraqi father and Algerian mother. He represented the Iraq under-19s in November 2021.

On 23 September 2022, Alai made his first team debut for Iraq in a penalty shootout loss against Oman in the 2022 Jordan International Tournament.

Honours

International
Iraq
 Arabian Gulf Cup: 2023

References

External links 
 

2003 births
Living people
Footballers from Gothenburg
Iraqi footballers
Iraq international footballers
Iraq youth international footballers
Swedish footballers
Iraqi people of Algerian descent
Swedish people of Iraqi descent
Swedish people of Algerian descent
Allsvenskan players
IFK Göteborg players
Association football defenders